In taxonomy, Methanoplanus is a genus of the Methanomicrobiaceae, comprising three species of methanogenic, or methane-producing, archaea. The cells are irregular coccoid in shape, tend to stain Gram-negative and do not form endospores.

See also
 List of Archaea genera

References

Further reading

=Scientific journals

Scientific books

Scientific databases

External links

Archaea genera
Euryarchaeota